Abshir Omar Jama (Huruse) is a Somali politician and the current Minister of Foreign Affairs of Somalia since 2 August 2022.

Political Career 
Huruse for the majority of his life was a businessman, only entering politics sometime in the 2010s. The first time Huruse entered the political stage was on 19 July 2020, when he was elected to become the Secretary General of the Puntland political organization Mideeye.

Minister of Foreign Affairs

2022 
On 2 August 2022, Prime Minister Hamza Abdi Barre appointed Huruse as the next Minister of Foreign Affairs and International Cooperation in part of a wider cabinet reshuffle he organized when taking office. On 13 August 2022, Huruse was officially sworn into the position along with his deputy Isaak Mohamud Mursal at a ceremony with PM Barre and the new State Minister for Foreign Affairs Ali Mohamed Omar in attendance.

As Minister of Foreign Affairs, Huruse has so far conducted multiple meetings and talks with representatives of Somalia's allies; including Algeria on 5 October, the Arab League on 7 September and 29 October, Bangladesh on 12 October, Belgium on 12 October, China on 10 September and 7 December, Denmark on 12 October, Djibouti on 16 August, Eritrea on 12 November, Ethiopia on 16 August, 28 September, and 6 October, the European Union on 10 September, Germany on 12 October, Ireland on 19 November, Italy on 10 September, Jordan on 31 October, Kenya on 17 August  and 14 September, Kuwait on 7 September and 31 October, Libya on 19 October, Norway on 3 December, Qatar on 22 August and 22 November, Serbia on 18 November, Slovenia on 7 September, South Africa on 12 October, Sudan on 4 October and 13 November, Sweden on 19 October, Turkey on 19 August and 12 October, the United Arab Emirates on 13 November and 26 November, the United Kingdom on 18 August, the United Nations on 18 August and 19 October, the United States on 15 December, Uganda on 9 August, and conducted a consultation meeting with the Prime Minister in Puntland.

Huruse, as a representative of Somalia, attended the Seventy-seventh session of the United Nations General Assembly in New York City. During the generate debate which primarily took place from 20 to 26 September 2022, Huruse held his first meetings with fellow representatives from the nations of Azerbaijan, Finland, Ireland, Libya, Morocco, Norway, Romania, Saudi Arabia, Sri Lanka, and Sudan. Huruse also held his second meetings Ethiopia with China. Most notably to come out of the event, Huruse's talks with Moroccan Foreign Minister Nasser Bourita led to an agreement between the two which approved the opening of a Somali "embassy in Rabat and a consulate general in Dakhla," according to Huruse.

During his time as Foreign Minister, Huruse has argued repeatedly before the international community and the United Nations to repeal the arms embargo, which has been in effect on the nation, sometime in 2023. Huruse has stated that the action is crucial to achieve victory in the fight against the militant group Al-Shabaab in the nation. Huruse has also argued for the inclusion of a Somalian seat in the UN Security Council in the June 2024 elections.

Legacy 
On 21 October, Huruse helped to organize the opening of the country to international companies– beginning with a "major" oil agreement with Coastline Exploration Ltd.

References

External links 
 The Minister (official government website)
 (official twitter account)

21st-century Somalian politicians
Foreign Ministers of Somalia
Living people
Puntland politicians
Year of birth missing (living people)